Daniel "Dani" Morer Cabrera (born 5 February 1998) is a Spanish professional footballer who plays as a right-back for FC Andorra, on loan from Portuguese club F.C. Famalicão.

Club career

Barcelona
Born in Mataró, Barcelona, Catalonia to a Spanish father and a Colombian mother, Morer joined Barcelona's youth setup in 2009, aged 11. In July 2017, he was promoted to the reserves in Segunda División.

Morer made his professional debut on 19 August 2017, coming on as a late substitute for Marc Cardona in a 2–1 away win against Real Valladolid. On 19 July 2019, he renewed his contract for a further season.

Morer scored his first senior goal on 12 October 2019, netting the third in a 3–0 Segunda División B home win against Orihuela CF.

Famalicão
Morer joined Portuguese side F.C. Famalicão on 3 September 2020 for a fee of €400,000. As part of the agreement, 45% of the rights remain to Barcelona.

Career statistics

Honours

Club
Barcelona
UEFA Youth League: 2017–18

References

External links

1998 births
Living people
Spanish people of Colombian descent
People from Mataró
Sportspeople from the Province of Barcelona
Spanish footballers
Footballers from Catalonia
Spanish expatriate footballers
Expatriate footballers in Portugal
Spanish expatriate sportspeople in Portugal
Association football defenders
Segunda División players
Primera Federación players
Segunda División B players
Primeira Liga players
FC Barcelona Atlètic players
F.C. Famalicão players
FC Andorra players
Spain youth international footballers